The 2021 MAC women's basketball tournament was the postseason basketball tournament that ended the 2020–21 college basketball season in the Mid-American Conference. Due to the ongoing COVID-19 pandemic, the entire tournament was held at Rocket Mortgage FieldHouse, in Cleveland, Ohio between March 10 and 13. The MAC Women's Tournament champion received the conference's automatic bid into the 2021 NCAA tournament. Central Michigan won the conference tournament championship game 77–72 over Bowling Green. Micaela Kelly was named the tournament's Most Valuable Player.

Format
Unlike the 2020 MAC women's basketball tournament only the top 8 finishing teams qualified and all games were played on a neutral court.

Seeds

Schedule

Bracket

See also
2021 MAC men's basketball tournament

References

Mid-American Conference women's basketball tournament
2020–21 Mid-American Conference women's basketball season
MAC women's basketball tournament
Basketball competitions in Cleveland
College basketball tournaments in Ohio
Women's sports in Ohio